Jarovnice is a village and municipality in Sabinov District in the Prešov Region of north-eastern Slovakia.

History
In historical records, the village was first mentioned in 1260.

Geography and demography
The municipality lies at an altitude of 441 meters and covers an area of 20.170 km². It has a population of 7,241 people. Jarovnice houses the largest community of Romani people in Slovakia.

1998 Flood
Heavy rains on July 20 of 1998 brought about the worst floods in Slovak history, changing otherwise quiet rivers in eastern Slovakia into a lethal force. The wild, overflowing water rushed from the river bed, sweeping over and engulfing everything in its path. The tragic results of these destructive floods were 63 dead, over 3,000 people evacuated from their homes, and two thousand houses destroyed in dozens of communities.

See also
 List of municipalities and towns in Slovakia

Notes

Genealogical resources

The records for genealogical research are available at the state archive "Statny Archiv in Presov, Slovakia"

 Roman Catholic church records (births/marriages/deaths): 1750-1896 (parish A)
 Greek Catholic church records (births/marriages/deaths): 1834-1895 (parish B)

External links
Surnames of living people in Jarovnice

Villages and municipalities in Sabinov District
Šariš